Qasr Tuba is an 8th-century Umayyad qasr or castle in the Amman Governorate of northern Jordan.

History
Qasr at-Tuba is the southernmost of the Umayyad desert castles in Jordan. Built in 743 CE by Caliph al-Walid II for his sons, al-Hakam and ‘Uthman, it was initially intended to consist of two roughly  courtyard dwellings with projecting semicircular decorative towers, but the project was never completed. The structure appears to have been abandoned some time after the assassination of Caliph al Walid.

The palace at Qasr at-Tuba may have been the residence or hunting lodge of the Caliph's sons, since hunting was a favoured pastime of the aristocracy. It also served as a caravanserai and was part of the Caliph's program to improve the routes to Hijaz, at a time when the number of caravans passing through the region had increased substantially. It lacks the imperial features associated with other desert castles, suggesting that it was used as a temporary or seasonal residence rather than a permanent one.

The site was brought to art historical attention after it was visited in 1896 by the Czech explorer Alois Musil.

Description
Its location is relatively isolated, in a desert location and access can be difficult. Most desert castles are located near to a source of water. Qasr al Tuba is no exception; wells are located nearby, close to a dry river bed ("wadi") and the site includes a dam and several wells.

The enclosure walls are supported by semi-round towers, except on the north side where the two gateways are flanked by two square rooms. The northwestern section is nearly intact and several lengths of curtain-wall exist on the western side. A prayer chapel has also been identified on the site.

The surviving structures consist of ashlar masonry with baked brick and barrel-vaulted roofs. The lintels are decorated with rosettes, intertwined with plant leaves, which give the impression of fine lace work.

It is a prime example of an Umayyad construction of brick vaults set on brick walls. The Lonely Planet Guide describes it as "easily the most impressive of the lesser-known castles."

See also
 Desert castles
 Islamic art
 Islamic architecture
 Jordanian art
 Umayyad architecture

References

External links
Qasr al-Tuba, Archnet Digital Library.
Photos of Qasr Tuba, American Center of Research
A general website about Qasr Tuba
Website about the discovery of Qasr Tuba
Website about the discovery of Qasr Tuba

Further reading
 Jonathan Bloom and Sheila Blair (eds), Grove Encyclopedia of Islamic Art & Architecture, [Three-Volume Set], Oxford University Press, 2009

Amman Governorate
Umayyad palaces
Umayyad architecture in Jordan
8th-century establishments in the Umayyad Caliphate